The Chamber of Senators is the upper house of the Plurinational Legislative Assembly of Bolivia. The composition and powers of the Senate are established in the Political Constitution of the State and others determined by Bolivian laws. The Senate is the legislative body of the country, where each Senator represents the interests of their Departments. The session room is located in the Legislative Palace building in Plaza Murillo.

The Senate has 36 seats. Each of the country's nine departments returns four senators elected by proportional representation (using the D'Hondt method). (From 1985 to 2009, the Senate had 27 seats: three seats per department: two from the party or formula that receives the most votes, with the third senator representing the second-placed party.) Senators are elected from party lists to serve five-year terms, and the minimum age to hold a Senate seat is 35 years.

The Senate was established in the 1831, disestablished later, and re-established in 1878.

Before the adoption of the new Constitution of 2009, this chamber was called National Senate.

References

National upper houses
Government of Bolivia
 
1831 establishments in Bolivia
1878 establishments in Bolivia